Gillian Tindall  (born 4 May 1938) is a British writer and historian. Among her books are City of Gold: The Biography of Bombay (1992) and Celestine: Voices from a French Village (1997). Her novel Fly Away Home won the Somerset Maugham Award in 1972. From the 1960s to the early 1990s, Tindall worked as a journalist, writing stories for The Guardian, the Evening Standard, The Times, and The Independent – and for many years she was a regular guest on the BBC Radio 3 arts discussion programme, Critics' Forum. Since 1963 she has lived in Kentish Town, North London.

Career
Beginning as a writer of fiction, she made her initial move into non-fiction with a biography of the fin de siècle novelist George Gissing. She wrote books about Londoners as separate in time as Rosamond Lehmann, a novelist contemporary of the Bloomsbury Group, and Wenceslaus Hollar, a Czech etcher of the seventeenth century. Another of Tindall's works, The Journey of Martin Nadaud: A Life And Turbulent Times (1999), reconstructs the life and voyage of a 19th-century Frenchman from the Limousin region – a master stonemason-builder, who became a French political figure, revolutionary, republican Member of Parliament, and then an exile in England for eighteen years. Following this book's publication, Tindall was awarded in France the title of Chevalier of the Order of Arts and Letters.

Tindall specialised in the genre of miniaturist history (see, by way of comparison, Portrait miniature in art). Her book The Fields Beneath (1977) explores the history of the London neighbourhood of Kentish Town and the spread of great cities in general, and is regarded as a seminal work of urban historical geography.

Tindall's book The House by the Thames (2006) is about the house built at 49 Bankside in London in 1710 and the buildings that preceded it on the site. The house has served as a home for prosperous coal merchants, an office, a lodging house, and once again as a private residence in the later 20th century. It has been erroneously assumed to be where Sir Christopher Wren lived during the construction of St Paul's Cathedral; other fantasy residents of older buildings on the site include Catherine of Aragon and William Shakespeare. The house still stands, in the shadow of the Globe Theatre.

Later books by Tindall's include Footprints in Paris: a Few Streets, a Few Lives (2009), which deals with the author's ancestors and their various connections to Paris over the generations; The Tunnel Through Time: A New Route For An Old London Journey (2016), which explores the layers of history that lie beneath the route of London's newest underground line, Crossrail; and The Pulse Glass and the Beat of Other Hearts (2019), a reflection on the links that exist between valued objects and human memories.

Family
Tindall's mother, Ursula Orange, was a novelist in the 1930s and 1940s. Ursula's father was Hugh William Orange, who received a knighthood for contributions to education in India. Hugh's father was the medical pioneer William Orange CB, MD, FRCP, LSA, second superintendent of Broadmoor Hospital.

Bibliography

Novels
No Name in the Street (1959, Cassell & Co, ASIN B0000CKDE1)
The Water and the Sound (1961, Cassell & Co, ASIN B002G3FW5W)
The Edge of the Paper (1963, Cassell & Co, ASIN B0031JPUCK)
The Youngest (1967, Secker & Warburg, ASIN B001AIVBTA)
Someone Else (1969, Walker & Company)
Fly Away Home (1971, Hodder & Stoughton)
The Traveller and His Child (1975, Hodder & Stoughton)
The Intruder (1979, Hodder & Stoughton)
Looking Forward (1983, Hodder & Stoughton)
To the City (1987, Hutchinson & Co)
Give Them All My Love (1989, Hutchinson & Co)
Spirit Weddings (1992, Hutchinson & Co)

Short stories
Dances of Death: Short Stories on a Theme (1973, Walker & Company)
The China Egg and Other Stories (1981, Hodder & Stoughton)
Journey of a Lifetime and Other Stories (1990, Hutchinson & Co)

Biography
The Born Exile: George Gissing (1974, Temple Smith)

Non-fiction
A Handbook on Witches (1965, Castle Books, ASIN B000JG9ESE)
Rosamond Lehmann: An Appreciation (1985, Chatto & Windus)
Countries of the Mind: The Meaning of Place to Writers (New edition 2011, Faber & Faber)
City of Gold: The Biography of Bombay (1992, Penguin Books Ltd. Travel Library)
Célestine: Voices From a French Village (1997, Henry Holt & Co.)
The Journey of Martin Nadaud: A Life and Turbulent Times (1999, St Martin's Press)
The Man Who Drew London: Wenceslaus Hollar in reality and imagination (2003, Pimlico)
The House By The Thames: And The People Who Lived There (2006, Pimlico)
Footprints in Paris: A Few Streets, A Few Lives (2009, Chatto & Windus)
The Fields Beneath (1977) (New edition 2011, Eland Press)
Three Houses, Many Lives (2012, Chatto & Windus)
The Tunnel Through Time: A New Route for an Old London Journey (2016, Chatto & Windus)
The Pulse Glass and the Beat of Other Hearts (2019, Chatto & Windus)

References

1938 births
Living people
Fellows of the Royal Society of Literature
British historians
20th-century British novelists
Writers from London